Butler Point Military Reservation was a coastal defense site located in Marion, Massachusetts as part of the defenses of the Cape Cod Canal.

History
The Butler Point Military Reservation was built on land purchased in 1942. Its mission was to protect the southern entrance of the Cape Cod Canal from possible air and naval attack. It was mirrored at the northern entrance by the Sagamore Hill Military Reservation. It never fired its guns in anger, but it did play an important part in the defense of the canal.

In 1942 the reservation had an unnamed battery of two 155 mm towed guns on "Panama mounts", circular concrete platforms for this type of gun. This battery was withdrawn in 1943 when an Anti-Motor Torpedo Boat (AMTB) battery of four 90 mm guns called AMTB 934 was built. This battery had an authorized strength of four 90 mm guns, two on fixed mounts and two on towed mounts, plus two towed 37 mm M1 guns or 40 mm Bofors M1 guns.

The site was disarmed in 1946.

Present
The two Panama mounts remain, but are partly buried.

See also
 Sagamore Hill Military Reservation
 Seacoast defense in the United States
 United States Army Coast Artillery Corps
 List of military installations in Massachusetts

References

External links
 List of all US coastal forts and batteries at the Coast Defense Study Group, Inc. website

Installations of the U.S. Army in Massachusetts
Cape Cod Canal
Marion, Massachusetts
Buildings and structures in Plymouth County, Massachusetts